Keith Eloi (born November 1, 1984) is a former American football wide receiver. He graduated from Lely High School in Naples, FL.  Keith was signed by the Washington Redskins as an undrafted free agent in 2009. He played college football at Nebraska-Omaha.

Professional career

Washington Redskins
Eloi was signed by the Washington Redskins as an undrafted free agent following the 2009 NFL Draft on May 7, 2009. He was released on September 5 and was re-signed to the practice squad on December 2. He was released from the practice squad on December 9.

Omaha Nighthawks
Eloi signed with Omaha Nighthawks on May 6, 2010.

Personal
In early March 2009 Eloi made some news by jumping off the ground into the back of a pickup truck.  The video of him doing this was uploaded to YouTube and has gotten over 367,000 views as of February 17, 2010.  On July 23, 2009, another video of Eloi was uploaded to YouTube that showed him jumping out of a swimming pool backwards and has gotten over 500,000 views as of February 17, 2010.

References

External links
Washington Redskins bio
Nebraska-Omaha Mavericks football bio

1984 births
Living people
Sportspeople from Naples, Florida
Players of American football from Miami
American football wide receivers
Nebraska–Omaha Mavericks football players
Washington Redskins players
Omaha Nighthawks players
Kansas City Command players